= Insanity's Heaven =

1996 novel by Ahmad Yusuf Daoud

- Author: Ahmad Yusuf Dawud
- Language: Arabic
- Publisher: Writer's Union
- Publication date: 1996
- Publication place: Syria

Insanity's Heaven (Arabic: فردوس الجنون) is a novel by Syrian author Ahmad Yusuf Dawood, first published in 1996. It is considered as one of the 100 best Arabic novels.

== Style ==
The novel employs an innovative narrative structure for its time, blending fiction with realism to explore psychological dilemmas. By constructing an alternative realm of existence, the author examines the mental states of the characters. A central motif is the use of the term Firdaus—a common metaphor in Arabic literature—to represent the highest celestial plane.

== The Plot ==
The story starts from the perspective of the second character (Sarhan), a mysterious character that has a great impact on the role of other characters. However, Sarhan's character is not as prominent as Baligh's, the primary character.

The story revolves around a young man named Baligh who was expelled and imprisoned in another region. He escaped from the prison with the help of a police officer. He coincidentally meets Sarhan while escaping. Then Sarhan leads Baligh to his strange tree which can be considered the focal point of all the critical events in the novel.

At the tree, Baligh meets a group of strange and intriguing group of friends only to form the weirdest relationships with them which lead him on further adventures. The origins of the protagonist is later on revealed, which the author uses to embody the troubled and inconsistent personality.

This novel dives deep into the human spirit and sends many messages that can be interpreted. It also deals with many topics such as sadism, fate, sacrifice, and friendship.

== Review ==
According to critics, the novel did not utilize the traditional artistic performance, but rather went beyond such a limitation by benefiting from the new art forms of the novel genre. Its reality achieved through the fictional depiction of the experience, which went out to freer and more comprehensive spaces of creativity through the indefinite possibilities of language and its realms. The events in the novel contain reality as an idea and embodiment to launch it into narrated convictions that hold .
